Charles Archer Hefferon (25 January 1878 – 13 May 1932) was an athlete representing South Africa who competed mainly in the marathon. Hefferon was born in Newbury, Berkshire, England, to an Irish father and an English mother but moved with his family to Canada and raised on a farm near Brandon, Manitoba. He settled in South Africa after fighting in the Boer War, where he worked as a prison officer in Bloemfontein.

He competed for South Africa in the 1908 Summer Olympics held in London, Great Britain in the marathon where he won the silver medal in the race famous for the dramatic finish of Dorando Pietri. Hefferon was leading until the last mile and a half, when he lost ground after accepting a drink of champagne and being patted on the back by a well-wisher in the crowd. He was overtaken by Pietri, who was subsequently disqualified for being helped over the line, and by the eventual winner, Johnny Hayes of the United States.

In 1909, he won his fifth South African national title for the 4 mile run (as well as one for 10 miles), but turned professional and moved to England, winning 4 and 10 mile titles there in 1910. In 1912, he returned to Canada and settled near Simcoe, Ontario. During World War I, he enlisted and served with the Royal Canadian Dragoons. After the war, Hefferon became acting chief of police in Dunnville before transferring to the Ontario Provincial Police. He worked on special assignments in Hamilton and then transferred to motorcycle patrol with the Department of Highways in Brantford, Blenheim, and starting in 1930 in Brampton.

Hefferon died in Brampton in 1932, when he was hit by a motorist while on duty.

References

External links 

1878 births
1932 deaths
Military personnel from Berkshire
People from Newbury, Berkshire
English people of Irish descent
Canadian people of Irish descent
South African people of Irish descent
English emigrants to Canada
Emigrants from Canada to Transvaal Colony
South African male long-distance runners
Canadian male long-distance runners
South African male marathon runners
Canadian male marathon runners
Sportspeople from Manitoba
Sportspeople from Bloemfontein
Olympic silver medalists for South Africa
Athletes (track and field) at the 1908 Summer Olympics
Olympic athletes of South Africa
South African prison officers
British Army personnel of the Second Boer War
Medalists at the 1908 Summer Olympics
Olympic silver medalists in athletics (track and field)
Canadian military personnel of World War I
Ontario Provincial Police officers
Accidental deaths in Ontario
Road incident deaths in Canada
Royal Canadian Dragoons soldiers
Sportspeople from Brandon, Manitoba